Jean IV de Beaumont (died July 1318) was a Marshal of France.

De Beaumont was appointed a Marshal of France by Louis X in 1315 following the resignation of Miles de Noyers. He was appointed Governor of Artois in December the same year.

References

Marshals of France
Medieval French nobility
Lords of France
13th-century births
Year of birth unknown
1318 deaths
13th-century French people
14th-century French people
14th-century military history of France